A Very Fatal Murder is a podcast produced by the satirical publication The Onion. A parody of true crime podcasts, A Very Fatal Murder is hosted by fictional New York City reporter David Pascall, who travels to the small town Bluff Springs, Nebraska to investigate the murder of prom queen Hayley Price. Pascall is voiced by David Sidorov, who also wrote for the podcast. The podcast premiered on January 23, 2018 and consists of 7 episodes. Season 2 was released in its entirety on May 11, 2019.

Production
A Very Fatal Murder satirizes popular true crime podcasts such as Serial, S-Town, and My Favorite Murder. According to head writer Katy Yeiser, the podcast is not meant as a take down of any particular podcast, but rather an ode to the genre.

Synopsis
The podcast follows fictional investigative reporter David Pascall (voiced by David Sidorov) who is searching for the perfect murder to create an award-winning podcast about. He is assisted by ETHL (the Extremely Timely Homicide Locator), an MIT-created computer programmed to find "the most interesting, violent, culturally relevant murder cases in America".

Episodes

Season 1

Season 2

Reception
The podcast received mostly positive reviews, and was largely praised for attacking true-crime tropes such as the "hot dead girl" and the romanticization of small-town America.

Awards

References

External links
Onion Public Radio

2018 podcast debuts
Audio podcasts
Crime podcasts
Comedy and humor podcasts
The Onion
American podcasts
2018 podcast endings